Pantoporia venilia, the Cape York aeroplane or black-eyed plane, is a butterfly of the family Nymphalidae. It is found in Australia (Queensland), Indonesia, Papua New Guinea and surrounding islands.

The wingspan is about 40 mm. Adults are black with a large white patch in the middle and an arc of white spots along the edge of each wing.

Larvae have been found on Lepidopetalum subdichotomum.

Subspecies
Pantoporia venilia venilia (Ambon, Serang, Geser, Banda Islands) 
Pantoporia venilia evanescens (Staudinger, 1888) (Bachan, Halmahera, Morotai, Ternate)
Pantoporia venilia godelewa (Fruhstorfer, 1908) (Buru)
Pantoporia venilia tadema (Fruhstorfer, 1908) (Waigeu, Misool, Gebe Islands)
Pantoporia venilia holargyrea (Fruhstorfer, 1908) (Aru, Kai, Tanimbar)
Pantoporia venilia pseudovenilia (Fruhstorfer, 1908) (Roon Island, north-west West Irian)
Pantoporia venilia anceps (Grose-Smith, 1894) (Jobi Island, West Irian)
Pantoporia venilia cyanifera (Butler, 1878) (Papua, Yule Island)
Pantoporia venilia glyceria (Fruhstorfer, 1908) (D'Entrecasteaux Archipelago, Trobriand, Woodlark Island)
Pantoporia venilia louisa Eliot, 1969 (Louisiade Archipelago)
Pantoporia venilia dampierensis (Rothschild, 1915) (Karkar Island)
Pantoporia venilia albopunctata (Joicey & Noakes, 1915) (Biak, Noemfoor Island)
Pantoporia venilia moorei (Macleay, 1866) (Cape York to Cairns)
Pantoporia venilia novohannoverana (Pagenstecher, 1899) (Bismarck Archipelago)
Pantoporia venilia mysolensis (Rothschild, 1915) (Misol)

External links
Australian Insects
Australian Faunal Directory

Pantoporia
Butterflies described in 1758
Taxa named by Carl Linnaeus